Ralph Chandler Harrison (October 22, 1833 – July 18, 1918) was an American attorney and Associate Justice of the Supreme Court of California from December 20, 1890, to January 5, 1903.

Early life
On October 22, 1838, Harrison was born in Cornwall, Connecticut. He attended Wesleyan University, graduating with a B.A. in 1853.

After graduation, he taught mathematics and ancient languages at Armenia Seminary, New York, from 1853 to 1856, and also obtained a M.A. degree at Wesleyan in 1856. In 1857, he was elected to the Connecticut State Legislature. He then studied at Albany Law School, where he was awarded a LL.B. in 1859.

Career
Harrison's law school classmate, David D. Colton, encouraged Harrison to move to California and in 1859 the two formed a law partnership in San Francisco. In 1868, Harrison joined with Yale Law School-trained attorney, John R. Jarboe, in the firm of Jarboe & Harrison.

In August 1890, Harrison won the nomination of the Republican Party for Supreme Court justice, and was elected to a 12-year term. In November 1902, Harrison sought a second term but lost the Republican nomination to Frank M. Angellotti.

In December 1903, Harrison was named a commissioner of the California Supreme Court, replacing John Haynes. In 1905, when the new Court of Appeal was established, Governor George Pardee named Harrison as the Presiding Justice of the First District.

After stepping down from the bench in 1908, Harrison returned to private practice. He continued as trustee of the public and law libraries of San Francisco. In October 1917, Harrison and his wife (Ella Spencer Reid) visited Carmel-by-the-Sea and stayed at the La Playa Hotel for a few weeks. During this visit they bought the block between Camino Real and Casanova Street, south of Ninth Avenue.

Death
Harrison died after a brief illness, at the age of 84, on July 18, 1918, at his apartment in San Francisco.

Bar and civic activities
Harrison was a member of the San Francisco Bar Association, and served as a trustee of the San Francisco Law Library in 1871. In January 1884, Harrison was elected a trustee of the California Academy of Sciences. In April 1896, he was named president of the board of the San Francisco Public Library. The Ralph Chandler Harrison Memorial Library in Carmel, California, is named in his honor.

Personal life
Harrison married twice. In July 1865, he married Juliet Lathrop Waite and they had two sons, both of whom became attorneys: Richard Chandler Harrison, who practiced with his father in the firm of Harrison & Harrison; and Robert Waite Harrison, an assistant district attorney. After her death in August 1890, Harrison married again in September 1892 to the younger Ella Spencer Reid in Rye, New York, at the country mansion of her uncle, Whitelaw Reid, later ambassador to the United Kingdom. His wife became involved with several art and literary societies in San Francisco.

Harrison was a member of the Bohemian Club in 1872.

References

External links
 California Supreme Court Historical Society page on Ralph C. Harrison
 In Memoriam
 Ralph C. Harrison opinions on the California Supreme Court. Courtlistener.com.
 Ralph C. Harrison opinions on the California Court of Appeal. Courtlistener.com.
 Past & Present Justices. California State Courts. Retrieved July 19, 2017.
 List of Past and Present Justices. California Court of Appeal, First District.

See also
 List of justices of the Supreme Court of California

1833 births
1918 deaths
People from Cornwall, Connecticut
Wesleyan University alumni
Albany Law School alumni
California state court judges
Judges of the California Courts of Appeal
Justices of the Supreme Court of California
19th-century American judges
19th-century American lawyers
20th-century American judges
20th-century American lawyers
Lawyers from San Francisco
California Republicans
Members of the Connecticut General Assembly